Mhaswad Dam, (also called Rajewadi dam) is an earthfill dam on Man river near Maan, Satara district in the state of Maharashtra in India.

Specifications

Purpose
 Irrigation

See also
 Dams in Maharashtra
 List of reservoirs and dams in India

References

Dams in Satara district
Dams completed in 1887
1887 establishments in India